USS YP-88 was a converted fishing vessel that served as an auxiliary patrol boat in the U.S. Navy during World War II.

History
She was laid down and completed in 1937; and named Adventure. In 1941, she was acquired by the U.S. Navy, designated as a Yard Patrol Craft (YP), and assigned to the 13th Naval District. She was one of the initial ships assigned to the Ralph C. Parker's Alaskan Sector of the 13th Naval District colloquially known as the "Alaskan Navy".

On 28 October 1943, she was grounded at Amchitka, Aleutian Islands and was struck from the Naval List.

References

Auxiliary ships of the United States Navy
1937 ships
Yard patrol boats of the United States Navy
Ships of the Aleutian Islands campaign